The 2002–03 season was the 100th competitive season in Belgian football.

National team
Belgium began their qualifying campaign for the 2004 UEFA European Championship.

* Belgium score given first

Key
 H = Home match
 A = Away match
 F = Friendly
 ECQ = UEFA European Championship 2004 Qualifying, Group 8
 og = own goal

Honours

See also
 Belgian First Division 2002-03
 2002 Belgian Super Cup
 Belgian Second Division
 Belgian Third Division: divisions A and B
 Belgian Promotion: divisions A, B, C and D

References
 FA website - International results

 
Seasons in Belgian football
Belgium